This is a list of Brazilian television related events from 1982.

Events

Debuts

Television shows

1970s
Turma da Mônica (1976–present)
Sítio do Picapau Amarelo (1977–1986)

Births
17 February - Mariana Weickert, model & TV host
22 March - Daniel Erthal, actor & model
14 April - Paolla Oliveira, actress
7 June - Bruno Freitas, actor & TV host
20 October - Roberta Rodrigues, actress

Deaths

See also
1982 in Brazil
List of Brazilian films of 1982